Osmodes hollandi, or Holland's white-spots, is a butterfly in the family Hesperiidae. It is found in Nigeria (the Cross River loop), Cameroon, Gabon, the Republic of the Congo, the Central African Republic, the Democratic Republic of the Congo, Uganda and north-western Tanzania. The habitat consists of forests.

References

Butterflies described in 1937
Erionotini